Pinxten is a Flemish surname. Notable people with the surname include:

 Harald Pinxten (born 1977), Belgian footballer
 Rik Pinxten (born 1947), Belgian anthropologist
  (born 1952), Belgian politician

Surnames of Belgian origin